Wakko's Wish (originally titled as Wakko's Wakko Wish) is a 1999 American animated musical comedy-adventure fantasy film based on the 1993–98 animated series Animaniacs, serving as the series finale until the announcement of the 2020 revival of the series. It relocates all of the Animaniacs characters to a quasi-19th century fairy tale world and portrays their race to find the wishing star that will grant them a wish.

The film was first released on VHS on December 21, 1999, by Warner Home Video under the Warner Bros. Family Entertainment label and the second released on January 25, 2000, as part of the Warner Bros. Century 2000 Collection. It contains 10 original songs and features a majority of the voice cast reprising their respective roles from the TV show.

Plot 
In the town of Acme Falls within the kingdom of Warnerstock, all the people (including the mime) live happily together. However, upon the death of their beloved king, Sir William the Good, Warnerstock enters a state of civil war. Taking advantage of the situation, the neighboring kingdom of Ticktockia (a parody of Time Inc. at the time of its merger with Warner Communications), led by King Salazar the Pushy (a caricature of Basil Rathbone and wearing a cloak with a clasp that resembles rapper Flavor Flav's clock necklace), takes over Warnerstock, and makes all its people poor and miserable due to overtaxing (also a parody of the formation of Time Warner, now Warner Bros. Discovery after WarnerMedia's (the renamed Time Warner) merger with Discovery Inc.). Three siblings, Yakko, Wakko, and Dot Warner, are particularly broke, as Dot needs an operation. Wakko finds work in another town to pay for it, but Plotz takes his pay – a ha'penny – from him for "taxes".

Wakko, saddened about Dot's illness and finding no other choice, wishes upon a star. A fairy (who calls himself a "Desire Fulfillment Facilitator" or "Pip") falls from the star and explains that Wakko had just chosen the only wishing star in the sky. The star itself falls shortly after in the mountains and the fairy tells Wakko that whoever touches the star first gets one wish. The following morning, the siblings tell the whole town in singing form about the star in their excitement, and all rush towards the glow in the mountains. King Salazar finds out about the star, orders Taxman Plotz and Ralph to stop the Warners from reaching the star alive, and orders his troops, led by the Captain of the Guard (a caricature of Dennis Hopper), to secure it.

Plotz does not stop the Warners from reaching the star at the same time as all the other townsfolk. However, the King's army has already built a military base around the star, and a small ice palace to the side of it, and the townspeople (including Plotz) are all captured and locked up so that the King may have his wish. The Warners hint that the wishing process is not as simple as the king thinks in a desperate bluff. The King captures the Warners and tortures them in outlandish ways, from Mr. Director's terrible singing (Mr. Director being a caricature of Jerry Lewis), then a filthy gas station restroom, and lastly Baloney the Dinosaur (a parody of Barney the Dinosaur).

After being traumatized, the Warners tell the King that any wish, which he makes, may have an ironic twist and demonstrate this to his annoyance. He orders the Warners executed, but Dot uses her "cuteness" to save them. The Warners escape.

As the King is about to make his wish (for the Warners to leave him alone), the Warners show up, and he tries shooting them himself with a cannon. The cannonball explodes after landing just short of hitting the Warners, injuring Dot from the shock wave of the blast. Yakko tries to convince Dot that she can make it, tearfully telling Dot the story of how she was born one last time. Dot appears to die, causing Yakko and the people of Acme Falls to cry in sorrow, along with some of the royal army. The Captain of the Guard becomes furious with King Salazar and gives him a angry speech calling him out for his cruel nature.

As everyone turns on the King (who seemingly appears a little remorseful), Wakko seizes his chance to head to the star, reaching it in time. Dot reveals that she had been acting and was not actually dead, thanks to Dot's acting lessons she's been taking; the two were buying time for Wakko, who wishes for two ha'pennies, to the delight of Yakko and Dot and the rest of the cast. The Warners then lead the townspeople back to town to help them fulfill their wishes.

Wakko uses the second of these to buy food and "season tickets for the Lakers". The first one pays for Dot's operation, which is revealed to be a plastic surgery to give her a beauty mark. Wakko's first ha'penny, however, returns prosperity to the town as the butcher, the baker, and the grocer spend the money that they earned, and the people from whom they make purchases in turn do the same.

The hospital finds Yakko, Wakko, and Dot's birth certificates, and reveals they are the heirs to the throne. Their parents, seen for the first (and only) time in a portrait, were the king and queen of Warnerstock. They (literally) boot Salazar out of their palace, and he is attacked by his own dogs. The Warners use their newfound royal authorities to grant the citizens of Acme Falls their wishes – except for the mime (which was Yakko's wish).

Taking his siblings by the hand, Yakko, Wakko, and Dot spin the Wheel of Morality one last time, which specifies the moral of the story is "Just cheer up and never ever give up hope".

Voice cast 

 Jess Harnell as Wakko
Maurice LaMarche voices Wakko's burps
 Tress MacNeille as Dot, Marita Hippo, Hello Nurse, and Mindy's mother
 Rob Paulsen as Yakko, Pinky, and Dr. Otto Scratchansniff
 Sherri Stoner as Slappy Squirrel
 Nathan Ruegger as Skippy Squirrel
 Maurice LaMarche as the Brain and Squit
 Frank Welker as Ralph, Thaddeus Plotz, Runt, Buttons, Chicken Boo, and Flavio Hippo
 Nancy Cartwright as Mindy
 Chick Vennera as Pesto
 John Mariano as Bobby
 Bernadette Peters as Rita
 Paxton Whitehead as King Salazar
 Ben Stein as Desire Fulfillment Facilitator (a.k.a. ""Pip")
 Jeff Bennett as Baloney, and the Captain of the Guard
 Paul Rugg as Mr. Director
 Julie Brown as Minerva Mink
 Tom Bodett as The Narrator
 Steven Bernstein as himself

Production and release 

Although Wakko's Wish had been rated highly amongst children and adults in test screenings, Warner Bros. decided to release it direct-to-video rather than spending money on marketing a wide release.  Wakko's Wish was originally slated for its VHS release in November 1998, but was pushed forward to December 21, 1999, and re-released on January 25, 2000, as part of the Warner Bros. Century 2000 Collection. It is the first Animaniacs production to use digital ink and paint. On August 25, 2008, Wakko's Wish was released for rental or purchase on iTunes. Wakko's Wish has also aired on cable networks such as Cartoon Network, Cinemax, Boomerang and more recently on The Hub (now Discovery Family). It is also available to download from the PlayStation Store. The film was released on DVD on October 7, 2014, shortly after the deaths of Liz Holzman in 2014 and Rusty Mills in 2012, two of the main directors of the film. It was also Chick Vennera's final performance as Pesto before his death in 2021.

Songs

Wakko's Wish features 11 original songs, composed by Julie Bernstein and Randy Rogel, with lyrics written by Tom Ruegger and Rogel. The score is composed by Animaniacs composers Richard Stone, Steve and Julie Bernstein, Gordon Goodwin, and Tim Kelly. The compositions Stone wrote for the film were some of the last he wrote for Warner Bros. Animation prior to his death on March 9, 2001. The cast of the film also doubles as a chorus for many of the musical numbers.

Reception 

Test screenings of Wakko's Wish on children and parents revealed very positive reactions to the film.  In February 1999, ToonZone reported that "97% of kids and parents gave it a review of 'highly positive'", and that "98% of children screened gave the film a rating of good, very good, or excellent".

Critical reception 

Wakko's Wish received generally positive reviews. Many critics praised the animation, character appearances, and music.  Many comments of the film focused on the introduction of a serious tone to a series known for its off-the wall humor.  Brett Rogers of AOL Hometown gave the film a positive review, saying that "[t]here’s a lot about this movie that will please die-hard Animaniacs fans," noting the appearances of almost all of the main characters and antagonists of the original series.  Rogers pointed that the pathos not usually seen in the series may leave some Animaniacs fans distant from the film, but that the serious tone is "backed up with superb voice acting," by Paulsen and Harnell. Other reviews were not so positive. MaryAnn Johanson of FlickFilosopher wrote that "[i]mposing the kind of story and characters necessary to fill a 90-minute movie upon the Animaniacs constrains their lunacy," and that doing so left the characters boring, so much that "older kids and adult fans of the Warners et al may be sorely disappointed." Michael Stewart of Entertainment Weekly found that the lack of the typical Animaniacs humor was positive, saying that the film "avoids the forced wackiness that plagues the television series," while "deliver[ing] some laughs for both kids and adults."  However, he noted a similar criticism to Johanson, saying that placing the entire Animaniacs cast into the film felt uncomfortable, and that the "[w]arm sentiments" of the film aren't the "specialty" of Animaniacs.  He rated the film a "C+" overall. Michael Dequina of TheMovieReport.com gave one of the most positive reviews of the film.  Praising the film's "smart, satiric in-jokes for the adults and broader slapstick for the young ones," Dequina said that the film was "one glorious example" of a family film that would appeal to the whole family, and rated the film with three and a half out of four stars.

Accolades 

In 2000, Wakko's Wish was nominated for four Annie Awards: One for "Outstanding Achievement in An Animated Home Video Production", one for "Outstanding Individual Achievement for Music in an Animated Feature Production" (Richard Stone, Steven Bernstein, Julie Bernstein, Gordon Goodwin & Timothy Kelly), one for "Outstanding Individual Achievement for Voice Acting By a Female Performer in an Animated Feature Production" (Tress MacNeille), and one for "Outstanding Individual Achievement for Voice Acting By a Male Performer in an Animated Feature Production" (Maurice LaMarche). Since its release, Wakko's Wish has been rated as one of the "Top 60 Animated Features Never Theatrically Released in the United States" by the Animated Movie Guide.

References

External links 

 
 

1999 films
1999 animated films
1999 comedy films
1999 direct-to-video films
1990s adventure films
1990s American animated films
1990s children's animated films
1990s children's comedy films
1990s children's fantasy films
1990s fantasy comedy films
1990s musical comedy films
1990s musical films
Amblin Entertainment animated films
American adventure comedy films
American children's animated adventure films
American children's animated comedy films
American children's animated fantasy films
American children's animated musical films
American fantasy films
American fantasy adventure films
American fantasy comedy films
American direct-to-video films
American musical comedy films
American television series finales
Animaniacs
Animated films about mammals
Animated films about orphans
Animated films about siblings
Animated films based on animated series
Films about wish fulfillment
Films scored by Richard Stone (composer)
Films set in Europe
Warner Bros. Animation animated films
Warner Bros. direct-to-video animated films
1990s English-language films